Chymotrypsin C is an enzyme. This enzyme catalyses the following chemical reaction:

 Preferential cleavage: Leu-, Tyr-, Phe-, Met-, Trp-, Gln-, Asn!

This enzyme is formed from pig chymotrypsinogen C and from cattle subunit II of procarboxypeptidase A.

See also 
 Elastase 4

References

External links 
 

EC 3.4.21